Dongguan South railway station is a station in Tangxia, Dongguan City, Guangdong Province, China. It is one of the stations on the Beijing-Hong Kong High-Speed Railway between Huizhou North railway station in Huizhou and Guangmingcheng railway station in Shenzhen City.

See also
 Ganzhou–Shenzhen high-speed railway
 Beijing-Hong Kong High-Speed Railway

References

Buildings and structures in Dongguan
Railway stations in Guangdong
Railway stations in China opened in 2021